The 1996–97 Vysshaya Liga season was the fifth season of the Vysshaya Liga, the second level of ice hockey in Russia. 17 teams participated in the league. CSKA Moscow won the Western Conference, and Metchel Chelyabinsk won the Eastern Conference. UralAZ Miass won the Cup competition.

First round

Western Conference

Eastern Conference

Second round

Western Conference

Eastern Conference

Cup

External links 
 Season on hockeyarchives.info
 Season on hockeyarchives.ru

Russian Major League seasons
2
1996–97 in European second tier ice hockey leagues